Blackpatch is an archaeological site in West Sussex, England, about  west of the village of Findon and about  north-west of Worthing.

It is the site of a Neolithic flint mine, and Bronze Age barrows. The site is a scheduled monument.

Description

Flint mine
The flint mine, which was levelled about 1950, is on the south-west slope of Blackpatch Hill.

The shafts and other features at the site were investigated from 1922 to 1932 by John Pull. Seven shafts were excavated. Flint flakes and pottery sherds were found in the infills from the shafts. Around the shafts were working areas where mined flint was processed. An antler pick from a shaft has been radiocarbon dated to about 3000 BC.

Pull later investigated the flint mines in West Sussex at Church Hill and at Cissbury.

Barrows
The site, now levelled, contained more than 12 round barrows, dating from the Bronze Age. Three of them were over infilled flint mine shafts, with others to the north-east.

References

Scheduled monuments in West Sussex
Prehistoric mines
Bronze Age sites in West Sussex
Worthing